Hasan Seyidov (16 August 1932 – 8 December 2004) was the chairman of the Council of Ministers of the Azerbaijan Soviet Socialist Republic from 22 January 1981 to 27 January 1989.

See also
Prime Minister of Azerbaijan

References

Azerbaijani politicians
1932 births
2004 deaths
Heads of the government of the Azerbaijan Soviet Socialist Republic